Tetonia is a city in Teton County, Idaho, United States, about  northeast of Idaho Falls, Idaho (center to center) and about  northwest of Denver, Colorado. The population was 269 at the 2010 census.

Geography
Tetonia is located at 43°48′50″N 111°9′35″W, in Teton County Idaho.

History
Tetonia was established as an agricultural town in the late 19th century, taking its name from the nearby Teton Range. Many of the businesses previously operating in Haden relocated to Tetonia following the arrival of the Union Pacific railroad.

Demographics

2010 census
As of the census of 2010, there were 269 people, 95 households, and 62 families residing in the city. The racial makeup of the city was 92.2% White, 0.7% Native American, 6.3% from other races, and 0.7% from two or more races. Hispanic or Latino of any race were 10.8% of the population.

There were 95 households, of which 46.3% had children under the age of 18 living with them, 49.5% were married couples living together, 11.6% had a female householder with no husband present, 4.2% had a male householder with no wife present, and 34.7% were non-families. 28.4% of all households were made up of individuals, and 10.5% had someone living alone who was 65 years of age or older. The average household size was 2.83 and the average family size was 3.61.

The median age in the city was 35.1 years. 36.1% of residents were under the age of 18; 5.1% were between the ages of 18 and 24; 26.7% were from 25 to 44; 24.5% were from 45 to 64; and 7.4% were 65 years of age or older. The gender makeup of the city was 48.7% male and 51.3% female.

Gallery

See also
 List of cities in Idaho

References

External links

 

Cities in Idaho
Cities in Teton County, Idaho